Golam Kabud-e Sofla (also Romanized as Golam Kabūd-e Soflá; also known as Kalam Kabūd-e Soflá) is a village in Sar Firuzabad Rural District, Firuzabad District, Kermanshah County, Kermanshah Province, Iran. At the 2006 census, its population was 66, in 11 families.

References 

Populated places in Kermanshah County